USS Crow (AMc-20) was a Crow-class coastal minesweeper acquired by the U.S. Navy for the dangerous task of removing mines from minefields laid in the water to prevent ships from passing.

World War II service 

The first ship to be named Crow by the Navy, she was in service attached to the 13th Naval District from 4 February 1941 to 23 August 1943 when she was sunk in Puget Sound by accident while acting as target towing ship for torpedo planes undergoing training.

Deactivation 

Crow was struck from the Navy List on 8 April 1944.

References

External links 
 

 

Minesweepers of the United States Navy
World War II mine warfare vessels of the United States
Maritime incidents in August 1943